Elizabeth Schneider (born 1962) is an American politician from Maine. Schneider served as a Democratic State Senator from Maine's 32nd District, representing part of Penobscot County, including the population centres of Orono and Lincoln. She was first elected to the Maine State Senate in 2004 after serving from 1996 to 2004 in the town government of Orono. Unable to run for re-election in 2012 due to term-limits, Schneider was replaced in the State Senate by Democratic State Representative Emily Cain.

Personal
Schneider and her family moved from Lexington, Virginia to Massachusetts a year after her birth in 1963. Schneider's parents were active in the peace and equal rights movements of the 1960s and 1970s. She graduated from an all-girls high school in Lower Manhattan and met her husband while studying at the University of Colorado. The couple moved to Orono in 1987.

References

1962 births
Living people
People from Lexington, Virginia
Democratic Party Maine state senators
Maine local politicians
University of Colorado alumni
People from Orono, Maine
Women state legislators in Maine
21st-century American politicians
21st-century American women politicians